Christopher Gunning (born 5 August 1944) is an English composer of concert works and music for films and television.

Gunning was born in Cheltenham, Gloucestershire.  He studied at the Guildhall School of Music and Drama where his tutors included Edmund Rubbra and Richard Rodney Bennett.

Gunning's film and TV compositions have received many awards, including the 2007 BAFTA Award for Best Film Music for La Vie en Rose, as well as three additional awards for Agatha Christie's Poirot, Middlemarch, and Porterhouse Blue. He has also won three Ivor Novello Awards, for the TV miniseries Rebecca, and the film scores for Under Suspicion (1991), and Firelight (1997). His other film scores include Goodbye Gemini (1970), Hands of the Ripper (1971), Ooh... You Are Awful (1972), the film version of Man About the House (1974), In Celebration (1975), Rogue Male (1976), Charlie Muffin (1979), Rise and Fall of Idi Amin (1981), Knights of God (1987), When the Whales Came (1989), Lighthouse Hill (2004) and Grace of Monaco (2014).

In the 1970s and 1980s, Gunning collaborated with rock musician Colin Blunstone and was responsible for the distinctive string arrangement on Blunstone's 1972 hit "Say You Don't Mind". He also provided the haunting string arrangements on "Won't Somebody Dance With Me", the Ivor Novello award-winning song written and performed by Lynsey De Paul as well as another of de Paul's hit singles "My Man and Me" and her 1974 album "Taste Me... Don't Waste Me".

Gunning's scores for The Big Battalions, Wild Africa, Cold Lazarus and When the Whales Came also received nominations for BAFTA and Ivor Novello Awards, and his music for the Martini advertising campaign, heard around the world for thirty years, won three Clio Awards.

Gunning composed the music for nearly all of the Poirot TV films starring David Suchet, and worked on all three series of Rosemary and Thyme featuring Felicity Kendal and Pam Ferris.

In addition to performances of his television and film scores, Gunning's Concerto for Saxophone and Orchestra and The Lobster have been performed at various venues including London's Southbank Centre. The Saxophone Concerto, played by John Harle with the Academy of St. Martin in the Fields, has been released by Sanctuary Classics, The Lobster is available on the Meridian label, and the Piano Concerto, Symphony No. 1 and Storm have been released by Albany Records. Recent works include concertos for the oboe and clarinet and the CD Skylines. The Royal Philharmonic Orchestra performed the premiere of Symphonies No.3 and No.4, coupled with Concerto for Oboe and String Orchestra.  This has been released by Chandos Records.
Gunning has now completed twelve symphonies, several of which have been recorded by the Royal Philharmonic Orchestra conducted by the composer and released on Signum Classics.

In recognition of Gunning's contribution to music, he received a BASCA Gold Badge Award on 19 October 2011.

Gunning has four daughters and lives in Hertfordshire. One of his daughters is a professional oboist. Another runs the travel blog wanderlustchloe.com.

References

External links
 
 Chandos Records

1944 births
Living people
20th-century classical composers
20th-century English composers
20th-century British male musicians
21st-century classical composers
21st-century British male musicians
British classical composers
British male classical composers
British television composers
English film score composers
English male film score composers
Alumni of the Guildhall School of Music and Drama
Best Original Music BAFTA Award winners
People from Cheltenham